Joyce Gemayel (born Joyce Tyan) is the former First Lady of Lebanon from 1982 to 1988, wife of former President of Lebanon Amine Gemayel, and mother of the assassinated politician Pierre Amine Gemayel, and Samy Gemayel.

Personal life
Joyce Tyan married Amine Gemayel in 1967, becoming part "of one of Lebanon's most prominent Christian political dynasties." They have three children, Nicole, Pierre and Samy.

Pierre Gemayel was assassinated on 21 November 2006. Images of Joyce Gemayel grieving her son were widely used in global media reports, illustrating the "tears and cries of anger" of the mourners. Subsequently, and alongside her husband, Gemayel spoke out against politically motivated killings in Lebanon, and encouraged Christian Lebanese to be "united" in opposition to Syrian influence in the country.

References 

First ladies of Lebanon
Joyce
Lebanese anti-communists
Lebanese Maronites
Lebanese socialites
Living people
Year of birth missing (living people)